Megumu Yoshida (吉田 萌, Yoshida Megumu, born 2 July 1995) is a Japanese competitor in synchronised swimming. She competed at the 2020 Summer Olympics, in the duet event with Yukiko Inui, and in the team event.

Career 
She participated for the 2019 World Aquatics Championships, 2018 Asian Games, and 2021 FINA Artistic Swimming World Series.

She studies at  Aichi Gakuin University.

References

External links 
 

1995 births
Living people
Japanese synchronized swimmers
Synchronized swimmers at the 2020 Summer Olympics
Olympic synchronized swimmers of Japan
Sportspeople from Nagoya
Medalists at the 2018 Asian Games
Artistic swimmers at the 2018 Asian Games
Asian Games medalists in artistic swimming
Asian Games silver medalists for Japan
World Aquatics Championships medalists in synchronised swimming
Artistic swimmers at the 2022 World Aquatics Championships
21st-century Japanese women